Mar Mord (also Romanized as Mār Mord and Mār Mard) is a village in Khatunabad Rural District, in the Central District of Jiroft County, Kerman Province, Iran. At the 2006 census, its population was 81, in 20 families.

References 

Populated places in Jiroft County